The Sims-Garfield Ranch is a site on the National Register of Historic Places located near Ryegate, Montana.  It was added to the Register on August 27, 1980.  The listing included six contributing buildings:
An original log cabin built by John T. Sally, perhaps as early as 1855
A six-room log house built by Joseph Sims in c. 1878
A ranch house built by the Victor Schaff family in 1910, renovated in 1927 and in 1942
A log barn, built in c. 1878
A stone barn, built in the 1880s
A frame board barn

References

Ranches on the National Register of Historic Places in Montana
National Register of Historic Places in Golden Valley County, Montana
Buildings and structures completed in 1877
1877 establishments in Montana Territory
Log buildings and structures on the National Register of Historic Places in Montana